The Nail Life Master Open Pairs is a North American bridge championship held at the fall American Contract Bridge League (ACBL) North American Bridge Championship (NABC).

The championship is a Matchpoints pairs event restricted to players with a Life Master rating.  It consists of two qualifying sessions and two final sessions, typically starting on the first Friday of the NABC.

History
The Nail Life Master Open Pairs has its roots in 1961 when a new championship event was created for male players with a rank of National Master or higher. 

In 1963, the rank for eligibility was increased to Life Master and in 1990, it became an open event so that female players with Life Masters status could also compete. Before and after opening to women, this tournament and the LM Women's Pairs have been structured and scheduled in parallel. Several women enter the open event and 1987 Women's winner Jill Meyers is a two-time Open winner.

The event is named after Bobby Nail, a 1974 winner.

Winners

Before and after opening to women in 1990, this event has been structured and scheduled parallel to the LM Women's Pairs.

See also
Smith Life Master Women's Pairs
Von Zedtwitz Life Master Pairs

Sources

List of previous winners, Page 8

2008 winners, Page 1

External links
ACBL official website

North American Bridge Championships